András Simon (born 30 March 1990) is a Hungarian footballer who currently plays for Gyirmót in the Nemzeti Bajnokság II of Hungary. He is the twin brother of Ádám Simon, also a footballer.

Career
Born in Salgótarján, Nógrád County, Simon signed for Liverpool from MTK Hungária in 2007 alongside Krisztián Németh.

On 21 August 2009, it was announced that Simon would spend the season on loan at Spanish club Córdoba CF, currently playing in the Segunda Division. He made his debut for Córdoba CF as a substitute in a 3–0 defeat by Real Betis on 30 August 2009. In December 2010 Simon disbanded his contract with Liverpool F.C. and joined Alemannia Aachen on a six-day trial. He played no first team games whilst at Liverpool. On 14 February he signed till the end of the 2010/11 season at Dutch Eredivisie side SBV Excelsior.

On 5 July 2011 Simon signed a four-year contract with Hungarian Division One club Győri ETO FC.

On 12 June 2019, MTK Budapest FC announced that Simon had returned to the club.

International career
Simon has represented Hungary at Under-17, Under-18, Under-19, Under-20 and Under-21 levels.

Honours

Clubs
MTK Hungária FC
Hungarian League:
Runners-up: 2006–07
Liverpool
Youth team
Dallas Cup winner: 2008
Reserves
Premier Reserve League National champion: 2007–08
Premier Reserve League North champion: 2007–08
Senior Cup: 2008–09

Hungary
 UEFA European Under-19 Championship:
Semi-finalist: 2008
 FIFA U-20 World Cup:
Third place: 2009

References

External links
 

1990 births
Living people
People from Salgótarján
Hungarian twins
Twin sportspeople
Hungarian footballers
Association football forwards
MTK Budapest FC players
Liverpool F.C. players
Córdoba CF players
Excelsior Rotterdam players
Győri ETO FC players
Lombard-Pápa TFC footballers
Kecskeméti TE players
Paksi FC players
Szombathelyi Haladás footballers
Gyirmót FC Győr players
Nemzeti Bajnokság I players
Segunda División players
Eredivisie players
Hungary youth international footballers
Hungary under-21 international footballers
Hungarian expatriate footballers
Hungarian expatriate sportspeople in England
Hungarian expatriate sportspeople in Spain
Hungarian expatriate sportspeople in the Netherlands
Expatriate footballers in England
Expatriate footballers in Spain
Expatriate footballers in the Netherlands
Sportspeople from Nógrád County